The 139th district of the Texas House of Representatives contains parts of northwestern Houston. The current Representative is Jarvis Johnson, who was first elected in 2016.

References 

139